Makhanlal Chaturvedi National University of Journalism and Communication (MCNUJC), also known as Makhanlal Chaturvedi Rashtriya Patrakarita Evam Sanchar Vishwavidyalaya or in short Makhanlal University (Mākhanlāl Viśvavidhālaya), is a public university in Bhopal, Madhya Pradesh, India. It is named  after Makhan Lal Chaturvedi, a freedom fighter, poet and journalist, and was established in 1992 by the Madhya Pradesh Legislative Assembly. It is India's first university for journalism and mass communication.

The university is approved by University Grants Commission and is a member of the Association of Indian Universities and the Association of Commonwealth Universities.

Location
The university has its main campus in Bhopal. It also has campuses in  Khandwa, Rewa and Datia.

Jurisdiction
Unlike conventional universities in India which have limited territorial jurisdiction, this university has nationwide jurisdiction.

Academics
The  university offers full-time programmes only, and does not offer any correspondence or distance education programmes/courses. It admits students based on national level entrance exams. The university has 11 academic departments and awards bachelor's, master's and PhD degrees.

See also
School of Broadcasting & Communication

Further reading
 Makhanlal Chaturvedi Rashtriya Patrakarita Avam Sanchar Vishwavidhyalaya, Madhya Pradesh ACT No. 15 1990

References

Journalism schools in India
Universities in Madhya Pradesh
Education in Bhopal
1991 establishments in Madhya Pradesh
Educational institutions established in 1991